Merrifieldia oligocenicus (synonyms Pterophorus oligocenicus)  is an extinct moth of the family Pterophoridae. It is the only known fossil of the family Pterophoridae. It was discovered in Aix-en-Provence, Bouches-du-Rhone in France. It is a late Oligocene species, dated to 25–30 million years BP.

References
  

Fossil taxa described in 1986
†oligocenus
Fossil Lepidoptera
Oligocene insects
Fossils of France